Antonio Francesco Orioli O.F.M.Conv.  (10 December 1778 in Bagnacavallo, Faenza in Italy – 20 February 1852 in Rome) was a cardinal of the Catholic Church.

Biography
Orioli joined the Order of the Friars Minor Conventuals (a branch of the Franciscans). He professed on 6 May 1793 at the convent of Bologna. He was educated at the Franciscan colleges of Bologna and Parma, and St. Bonaventure College in Rome. In 1804 he received a doctorate in arts and theology.

From 1807 to 1809, Orioli was Lector of theology at St. Bonaventure College in Rome. He moved to France in 1809, returning to Italy in 1812. Here he became a professor at St. Bonaventure College in  1817.

He was also definitor general of his order and consultor of the S.C. of the Index. He was an examiner of the Roman Clergy for the promotion to academic chairs. On 4 September 1832, he became vicar general of his order.

On 15 April 1833, Orioli was elected bishop of Orvieto, being consecrated by Cardinal Giacinto Placido Zurla on 1 May that year. He served at the basilica of Ss. XII Apostoli in Rome.  Cardinal Zurla was assisted by Giovanni Soglia, titular archbishop of Efeso, and by Alessandro Bernetti, bishop of Recanati.

He was made cardinal in February 1838 by Pope Gregory XVI. He received the red hat and the title of S. Maria sopra Minerva on 15 February 1838. In December 1841, he resigned pastoral government of the diocese. He participated in the conclave of 1846 to elect Pope Pius IX. Orioli became prefect of the S.C. of Bishops and Regulars on 2 May 1847. From 5 May to 4 June 1848, he served as Secretary of State ad interim.

He opted for the title of Ss. XII Apostoli on 30 September 1850.

Orioli died in Rome.  He was exposed and buried in the church of Ss. XII Apostoli.  Pope Pius IX participated in his funeral.

Timeline
10 Dec 1778 Born in Bagnacavallo
15 Apr 1833 Appointed Bishop of Orvieto, Italy
1 May 1833 Ordained Bishop of Orvieto, Italy
12 Feb 1838 Elevated to Cardinal
12 Feb 1838 Appointed Cardinal - Priest of Santa Maria sopra Minerva
18 Dec 1841 Resigned as Bishop of Orvieto, Italy
2 May 1847 Appointed Prefect of the Congregation of Bishops and Regulars
30 Sep 1850 Appointed Cardinal - Priest of Ss XII Apostoli
20 Feb 1852 Died while Prefect of the Congregation of Bishops and Regulars

References

External links
Florida International University

1778 births
1852 deaths
19th-century Italian cardinals
Cardinals created by Pope Gregory XVI
Bishops of Orvieto
19th-century Italian Roman Catholic bishops
Conventual Friars Minor